Castlevania, known in Japan as   is a gothic horror action-adventure video game series and media franchise about Dracula, created and developed by Konami. It has been released on various platforms, from early systems to modern consoles, as well as handheld devices such as mobile phones. The franchise has expanded into several spin-off video games and other media, including comic books and an animated television series.

Castlevania is largely set in the eponymous castle of Count Dracula, the main antagonist of the Belmont clan of vampire hunters. It debuted with 1986's Castlevania for the Nintendo Family Computer Disk System. The first entry and the majority of its sequels are side-scrolling action platformers, and were succeeded by the 1997 game, Castlevania: Symphony of the Night. Originally released for the PlayStation, it returned to the nonlinear gameplay seen in Castlevania II: Simon's Quest, which introduced role-playing elements and exploration. Several installments later adopted Symphony of the Nights gameplay, and along with Super Metroid, it has popularized the Metroidvania genre. 2010 saw the release of Castlevania: Lords of Shadow, a 3D action-adventure reboot of the series developed by MercurySteam and Kojima Productions.

Castlevania is one of Konami's most successful and prominent franchises; several of its entries are ranked among the best video games ever made.

Games

Most Castlevania titles have been released in Japan, North America, Europe and Australia on various video game consoles, personal computers (PC) and mobile phones, with additional remakes and re-releases. The first console title, Castlevania, was released on the Famicom Disk System in 1986 and in North America in 1987 on the Nintendo Entertainment System (NES). A 2D sidescrolling action game where the player progresses through six stages, many principal features of the Castlevania series originated with it. It has been ported to many platforms, such as the NES Classic Edition. Also released in 1986 was Vampire Killer for the MSX home computer, which played significantly different from the original Castlevania, where players had to search for the exit before they could proceed to the next stage. Following that year, in 1987, Castlevania II: Simon's Quest further departed from the standard platforming genre of the first Castlevania for a game more similar to the nonlinear gameplay of Metroid, with several role-playing elements such as a world map which the player is free to explore and revisit. Castlevanias first arcade game, Haunted Castle (1988), returned to the linear platforming gameplay of the original. This continued with the first handheld Game Boy entry, Castlevania: The Adventure and the NES sequel, Castlevania III: Dracula's Curse, both released in 1989. Dracula's Curse added features to the original gameplay, including alternate stages and multiple playable characters. The Adventure saw a Game Boy sequel, Castlevania II: Belmont's Revenge, in 1992 and a remake, Castlevania: The Adventure ReBirth, developed by M2 for the WiiWare service in 2009.

The franchise's first 16-bit home console game, Super Castlevania IV, was released for the Super Nintendo Entertainment System (SNES) in 1991. A Castlevania title for the Sharp X68000 home computer was released in Japan in 1993 and would not be available in English until Castlevania Chronicles (2001) for the PlayStation. During the same year, Castlevania: Rondo of Blood was released for the PC Engine and was not localized in English until it was included with Castlevania: The Dracula X Chronicles (2007) for the PlayStation Portable. The first Castlevania produced for a CD-ROM, Rondo of Blood featured Red Book audio and fully voiced dialogue. The game's content would be reused in Castlevania: Dracula X, a game for the SNES in 1995. Castlevania: Bloodlines (1994) was the first Castlevania entry produced for a Sega console, the Genesis, and was not re-released until 2019 on the multi-platform Castlevania Anniversary Collection.

In 1997, Castlevania: Symphony of the Night and Castlevania Legends were launched for the PlayStation and Game Boy, respectively. Symphony of the Night introduced a major change to the gameplay, incorporating role-playing elements and a nonlinear map that the player could freely explore, which was previously seen in Simon's Quest and Nintendo's Metroid series. This would be the gameplay for several future titles, beginning with the Game Boy Advance entries Circle of the Moon, Harmony of Dissonance, and Aria of Sorrow, which were released from 2001 to 2003. Aria of Sorrow received a 2005 sequel, Dawn of Sorrow for the Nintendo DS, which was followed by Portrait of Ruin (2006) and Order of Ecclesia (2008).

Under the development of Konami's Kobe branch, the first game in the series to employ 3D graphics was Castlevania for Nintendo 64 in 1999, and it received an expansion called Castlevania: Legacy of Darkness later that year.  In 2003, the next 3D Castlevania title, Lament of Innocence debuted for the PlayStation 2 with combat-oriented hack and slash gameplay that drew comparisons to Devil May Cry and God of War. It was followed two years later by Castlevania: Curse of Darkness.

A reboot of the franchise launched with Castlevania: Lords of Shadow in 2010, a multi-platform 3D action title developed by MercurySteam and co-produced by Hideo Kojima. Two sequels, Lords of Shadow – Mirror of Fate (2013) and Lords of Shadow 2 (2014) have both received multi-platform releases.

Spin-offs
Castlevania has spawned numerous spin-offs, the first being the 1990 platformer, Kid Dracula for the Famicom, a parody which stars the eponymous character. It was released for the first time in English for the Castlevania Anniversary Collection (2019). The game received a sequel for the Game Boy, also titled Kid Dracula. Castlevanias first multiplayer online fighting game, Castlevania Judgment debuted for the Wii in 2008 and was developed by Eighting. Another multiplayer online title, Castlevania: Harmony of Despair, was available cross-platform in 2010, where players could play as past Castlevania characters and explore stages. A game for iOS called Castlevania: Grimoire of Souls, a multiplayer title starring Castlevania cast members, was released by Konami on September 16, 2019.

Arcade and slot machines have been produced for the series. Castlevania: The Arcade (2009), a light gun shooter utilizing an LED remote, has been released in Japan and Europe. The Japanese spin-off series, Pachislot Akumajō Dracula, is a pachislot line of Castlevania titles released between 2009 and 2017. The first three are based on the video game Dracula's Curse, while a fourth game based on the Lords of Shadow reboot, Pachislot Akumajō Dracula: Lords of Shadow, was made available in 2017.

Castlevania characters and elements have appeared in crossovers and other titles such as the Konami Wai Wai World series, Contra: Hard Corps, DreamMix TV World Fighters, Bomberman R and Super Smash Bros. Ultimate.

Common elements

Gameplay

Castlevania, released for the NES in 1986 is a platform game in which the player takes the role of Simon Belmont, a descendant of the Belmont clan, a family of vampire hunters. He travels to Dracula's castle, Castlevania, and fights his way through the castle annihilating Dracula himself and the castle. Belmont's main weapon is a whip called the Vampire Killer, while the secondary weapons include throwing daggers, bottles of holy water that act as small fire bombs, throwing axes that arc overhead, a watch that stops time, and a cross that acts like a boomerang. These are powered by hearts which are collected by destroying candles and killing monsters. Hidden items such as power-ups and food (health replenishment) items are found by attacking walls within the levels, a feature inspired by Nintendo's Super Mario Bros. with hidden items across the game's levels.

Vampire Killer, released in 1986 for the MSX 2 computer and developed alongside the original Castlevania (the two share the same title in Japanese), departs from the more straightforward platforming gameplay of Castlevania, instead introducing an open-ended, exploration-heavy form of gameplay. Castlevania II: Simon's Quest featured nonlinear gameplay even more open-ended than that of Vampire Killer, with several exclusive elements such as a world map the player was free to explore and revisit. The player could also purchase supplies, equipment and weapon upgrades in several different towns, making it more like an action role-playing game. It introduced a persistent world with a day-night cycle which altered gameplay, and offered three possible endings depending on the time it took to complete the game. Castlevania III: Dracula's Curse for the NES has more in common with the original NES Castlevania and added features, including nonlinear elements such as alternate branching paths with different stages and alternate endings depending on the player's choices, as well as multiple player characters.

A turning point in the gameplay mechanics of the series was Castlevania: Symphony of the Night. Expanding on the open-ended style of gameplay previously used in Castlevania II: Simon's Quest, Symphony of the Nights style of gameplay has been termed "Metroidvania" due to its similarities with the nonlinear and exploration-focused side-scrolling games of the Metroid series. It used role-playing elements, such as collectible weapons, armor and hidden orbs. Many subsequent Castlevania games have since followed this template.

Plot and setting

The Castlevania franchise heavily references the horror films produced by Universal Pictures and Hammer Film Productions. Creator of the series, Hitoshi Akamatsu, wanted players to feel like they were in a classic horror film. Werewolves, zombies, Frankenstein's monster, and Count Dracula make recurring appearances. Alucard, introduced in Castlevania III: Dracula's Curse, is a reference to the character of the same name from the 1943 film, Son of Dracula. The games include folklore and mythological monsters such as Medusa, as well as direct references to literary horror. Castlevania: Bloodlines explicitly incorporates the events of Bram Stoker's Dracula into the series, and the recurring character Carmilla is based on the 1872 novel Carmilla by Joseph Sheridan Le Fanu.

Castlevania mainly takes place in the castle of Count Dracula, who resurrects every hundred years to take over the world. With the exception of some games, the players assume the role of the Belmonts, a clan of vampire hunters who have defeated Dracula for centuries with the Vampire Killer. The Vampire Killer is a legendary whip that is passed down to their successors and can only be used by them. In Castlevania: Bloodlines, the whip has been inherited by John Morris, the son of Quincey Morris, who is a distant descendant of the Belmonts. Other recurring characters throughout the series include the dhampir Alucard, who sides with Trevor Belmont against his father Dracula in Dracula's Curse. Trevor is joined by Sypha Belnades, a vampire hunter who fights using magic and marries Trevor by the end of the game. Descendants of the Belnades clan, such as Carrie Fernandez and Yoko Belnades, would make appearances as playable characters in later titles.

Castlevania: Lords of Shadow is a reboot of the franchise, with its first game set in Southern Europe during the Middle Ages. The main character, Gabriel Belmont, is a member of the Brotherhood of Light, an elite group of holy knights who defend people from supernatural creatures. With a retractable chain whip called the Combat Cross, Gabriel fights a malevolent force known as the Lords of Shadow in order to obtain the God Mask, which he believes can bring back his deceased wife. In Castlevania: Lords of Shadow - Mirror of Fate, Gabriel stars as Dracula, the main antagonist of Simon and Trevor Belmont. The sequel, Castlevania: Lords of Shadow 2 is set during modern times, where Dracula is looking for a way to put an end to his immortality.

In 2002, the games Legends, Circle of the Moon, Castlevania (1999), and Legacy of Darkness were retconned from the official chronology by Koji Igarashi, a move which had been met with some criticism by fans. Igarashi noted that Legends conflicted with the plotline of the series, and that the reason for Circle of the Moons removal was not due to his non-involvement with the game, but instead the intention of the game's development team for Circle of the Moon to be a stand-alone title. The American 20th Anniversary Pre-order Bundle for Portrait of Ruin in 2006 featured a poster with a timeline that re-included the games other than Legends. In 2007, Konami still excluded them from the canon on the official Japanese website. Igarashi has said that he considered the titles a "subseries".

Development

Castlevania was directed and programmed by Hitoshi Akamatsu for the Family Computer Disk System in 1986. The game's staff roll features names taken from horror film icons, with Akamatsu being credited as 'Trans Fishers', a reference to film director Terence Fisher. This is possibly because Konami did not allow the use of real names at the time in order to prevent other companies from hiring people who worked for them. An admirer of cinema, Akamatsu approached projects with a "film director's eye", and said the visuals and music for Castlevania were "made by people who consciously wanted to do something cinematic." The protagonist Simon Belmont uses a whip because Akamatsu liked the mechanics of a weapon able to repel enemies, and also because Akamatsu was a fan of Raiders of the Lost Ark. After the success of Castlevania, it was released in cartridge format for the Nintendo Entertainment System (NES) as one of its first major platform games. The international title Castlevania was the result of Konami of America senior vice president Emil Heidkamp's discomfort with Akumajō Dracula, which he believed translated as "Dracula Satanic Castle." Because of Nintendo of America's censorship policies at the time, most instances of blood, nudity and religious imagery were removed or edited in early Castlevania games.

Akamatsu directed Castlevania II: Simon's Quest in 1987, which adopted gameplay similar to Nintendo's Metroid. When asked if Metroid had any inspiration, Akamatsu instead cited Maze of Galious, another Konami title which featured exploration and puzzle solving. His last game in the series, Castlevania III: Dracula's Curse (1989), returned to the standard platforming genre of Castlevania. Since Konami's Teenage Mutant Ninja Turtles games sold many copies, their development was prioritized above other titles, leading the developers for Dracula's Curse to make a game that would outdo them. Simon's Quest and Dracula's Curse were not a commercial success, and Akamatsu was demoted to working in one of Konami's game centers before he chose to resign.

In 1993, three Castlevania games were in parallel development, which included Akumajō Dracula, Rondo of Blood, and Bloodlines. Directed and produced by Toru Hagihara, Rondo of the Blood was the first installment made for a CD-ROM and the first to be fully voiced. Hagihara would go on to direct a sequel, Symphony of the Night (1997) for the PlayStation, with Koji Igarashi joining him as the assistant director and story writer. Joining the staff was artist Ayami Kojima, who was hired to introduce a new look for Castlevania. She would be the character designer for several future Castlevania titles. Igarashi said it began development as "something of a side story series". From the outset, the game was supposed to take the franchise in a new direction. The gameplay took a departure from the original platforming entries, instead adopting nonlinear exploration and role-playing game elements, which were last seen in Simon's Quest. The critical reaction to Simon's Quest and its gameplay allowed them to pitch Symphony of the Night to Konami. Igarashi was eventually asked to finish the game as the assistant director after Hagihara was promoted to head of the division. On release, Symphony of the Night was well-received and became a sleeper hit, but its commercial performance was mediocre, particularly in the United States where it was meagerly publicized.

The first Castlevania game to feature 3D computer graphics began development in 1997 on the Nintendo 64 by Konami Computer Entertainment Kobe (KCEK) as Dracula 3D. Like most of its predecessors, it was an action-adventure and platforming game. It was eventually released as Castlevania in 1999 and received an expanded version titled Castlevania: Legacy of Darkness during the same year. KCEK's last Castlevania game was the acclaimed Circle of the Moon, released as a launch title for the Game Boy Advance in 2001. Circle of the Moon was the first entry to feature Metroidvania gameplay since Symphony of the Night. Igarashi, who was not involved with the game, was critical of Circle of the Moon. In 2002, he retconned Castlevania Legends (1997) and the games developed by KCEK from the series' chronology due to story conflicts, which was met with some resistance from fans. After KCEK was dissolved during 2002, the Game Boy Advance received a second installment, Castlevania: Harmony of Dissonance, now produced by Igarashi and developed by Konami Computer Entertainment Tokyo (KCET). Starting with Harmony of Dissonance, the Japanese games adopted Castlevania as the title for a brief period. According to Igarashi, the developers did this since Count Dracula is not always the main antagonist. This continued with Castlevania: Lament of Innocence (2003), a 3D title developed as a new starting point for the series. Konami eventually returned to the title Akumajō Dracula with the Japanese release of 2005's Castlevania: Dawn of Sorrow for the Nintendo DS. Dawn of Sorrow and Portrait of Ruin (2006) introduced a new art style in hopes of broadening the player demographic and preventing younger Nintendo DS owners from being put off by Ayami Kojima's art. This discontinued with Castlevania: Order of Ecclesia in 2008.

Due to concern over the poor sales of the recent Castlevania games, a number of prototypes in development competed to become the next Castlevania installment, which included a game by Igarashi announced at Tokyo Game Show 2008 and Castlevania: Lords of Shadow by Spanish studio MercurySteam. Konami told MercurySteam the game would be an original intellectual property (IP) when it was first greenlit as a Castlevania title. Konami eventually asked them to cease work on Lords of Shadow while it was still in its early stages, until producer David Cox showed the Japanese senior management the game and was offered help by video game designer Hideo Kojima. According to Igarashi, development on his project had not been going smoothly, and Konami had canceled it and chose Lords of Shadow as the pitch for the next Castlevania entry. Produced by Dave Cox and Hideo Kojima, Lords of Shadow was a multi-platform 3D action-adventure reboot of the series. Kojima offered his input on the project and also oversaw the game's localization in Japan. It was the first Castlevania to feature celebrity voice talent, starring Robert Carlyle in the lead role and Patrick Stewart. The art style departed from the previous games in favor of one inspired by Guillermo del Toro's work. Lords of Shadow was met with positive reception in 2010 and a commercial success, becoming the best selling Castlevania game to date. It was followed by two sequels, Mirror of Fate (2013) and Castlevania: Lords of Shadow 2 (2014). Lords of Shadow 2 was not as well received as its predecessor. Following its release, an anonymous source claiming to be employees from MercurySteam alleged that development on the game had been troubled.

After having been moved to Konami's social division in 2011, Igarashi felt he was unable to release any new games when Konami shifted its focus towards mobile game development. He left in March 2014 to independently create Bloodstained: Ritual of the Night, a spiritual successor to Castlevania. Dave Cox followed Igarashi's resignation a few months later. Recent Castlevania titles released under Konami's recent business model include pachinko and slot machines based on the IP.

Audio
Castlevanias music has been critically acclaimed and released on many albums. The music for the first Castlevania game was composed by Satoe Terashima and Kinuyo Yamashita, of Konami Kukeiha Club of composers, shortly after graduating from college. Yamashita was credited under the pseudonym James Banana for her work on the Disk System version of the game.

Kenichi Matsubara composed for the sequel, Simon's Quest, and the arcade installment Haunted Castle. In 1993, Michiru Yamane created the soundtrack to Castlevania Bloodlines, and would compose the music for several installments, including Symphony of the Night.

Most of the music in the series changes from game to game, but some themes recur often. These include "Vampire Killer", composed by Satoe Terashima, first composed by Kenichi Matsubara, and "Beginning" by Jun Funahashi. These three tracks first appeared in Castlevania, Castlevania II: Simon's Quest and Castlevania III: Dracula's Curse respectively. Several songs, including "Vampire Killer" and "Bloody Tears", were featured in the soundtracks of other Konami games, including Konami Wai Wai World, Contra: Hard Corps, and Konami Krazy Racers, and inter-company crossovers such as DreamMix TV World Fighters, and Super Smash Bros. Ultimate.

Reception and legacy

The Castlevania franchise had sold over 20 million copies worldwide ; it had previously sold over  units by 1993. The franchise has received mostly positive reviews, with the most acclaimed game being Symphony of the Night for the PlayStation and the most panned being Judgment, with aggregate scores of 93 and 49, respectively, on Metacritic and 93.38% and 52.71%, respectively, on GameRankings.

Many of the games have appeared on lists of video games considered to be the best. Symphony of the Night appeared at #16 on IGN "Top 100 games" and was one of the first to be introduced on the GameSpot "The Greatest Games of All Time". Both acclaimed the game to successfully making a game in 2D while the industry was moving to 3D. Castlevania III: Dracula's Curse was named the 9th best 8-bit game by GameTrailers. Super Castlevania IV was named the 11th best game of the SNES by ScrewAttack on their "Top 20 SNES Games". The series as a whole was named the 4th best franchise in games ever by IGN, behind only Final Fantasy, The Legend of Zelda and Mario, and citing Super Castlevania IV and Symphony of the Night as highlights. Aria of Sorrow was named the 2nd best game on the Game Boy Advance and one of the must buys for the system, according to the same website. Castlevania, Super Castlevania IV, and Aria of Sorrow appeared on Nintendo Power's "Top 200 Games" list.   Trivia about the series has been mentioned in the Guinness World Records: Gamer's Edition 2008.

In other media

Simon Belmont was one of the stars in the animated series Captain N: The Game Master. He was a member of the N-Team, a group of mostly video game characters who defended Videoland against the antagonist Mother Brain from Metroid. Dracula, referred to only as "the Count", appeared as a villain in Captain N. Alucard appeared in one episode, though he was portrayed as a rebellious skateboarding teenager. Several other Castlevania monsters had minor roles, including Frankenstein's Monster, the Mummy, the Wolf Man, and the Skull Knight. Simon is portrayed as egotistical on the show and his physical appearance differs from his design in the video game series.

In 2005, IDW Publishing released a comic book adaptation, Castlevania: The Belmont Legacy, written by Marc Andreyko with art by E. J. Su. It was based on Castlevania: The Adventure. In 2008, a graphic novel adaption of Curse of Darkness was released by Tokyopop in English.

The streaming service Netflix released an American animated series titled Castlevania as part of its original programming. The show is being showrun by Adi Shankar, who had previously teased plans for an animated mini-series based on Castlevania III: Dracula's Curse in 2015, and is written by Warren Ellis. Fred Seibert and Kevin Kolde co-produce. The series is animated by Seibert's Frederator Studios and Powerhouse Animation Studios, under Michael Hirsh's Wow Unlimited Media company. The show's first season released on July 7, 2017, and ran for four episodes, while the second season premiered on October 26, 2018, and ran for eight episodes. By the time the second season became available in 2018, Castlevania had reportedly garnered nearly  viewers worldwide according to Netflix analytics, becoming one of the most successful original animated shows on Netflix. A third season released on March 5, 2020, and ran for 10 episodes. The fourth and final season was released on May 13, 2021, and a new series set in the Castlevania universe is in the works. It will focus on a descendant of Trevor, Richter Belmont, and Maria Renard in France during the French Revolution.

The franchise has its own toy line manufactured by NECA which consists of six figures of Simon Belmont, Alucard, Dracula (available in two variants with one variant with its mouth closed and another one with its mouth open showing Dracula's vampire fangs), Succubus and a Pixel Simon mini figure which was exclusively available as a promotional item at Comic-Con 2007 where the figures were first shown in full form.

The franchise consists of a calendar of Lament of Innocence available with the limited edition of the game and containing seven illustrations and another released as a promotion for Castlevania Judgment from April 2009 to March 2010 containing images of various Castlevania characters from the game. Artbooks of many games have been released. The franchise includes comics, prize collection artworks of Symphony of the Night and Judgment as part of its print media.

Adapted and illustrated by Kou Sasakura, a two-volume manga adaptation titled  was published in Japan from 2005 to 2006.

Cancelled projects

A Castlevania television series was considered in the late 1980s as part of the Super Mario Bros. Power Hour, a one hour animation block of Nintendo focused video game adaptations. Concept art was produced for the project by DIC Animation City. Only the Mario and The Legend of Zelda segments for the block were ultimately produced, airing in 1989 as part of The Super Mario Bros. Super Show!.

A Castlevania film was planned in the late 2000s. However, in December 2007, Rogue Pictures halted active development of Castlevania due to the writers' strike and, later, the sale of the studio to Relativity Media and possibility of a screen actors' guild strike. On May 27, 2009, the Castlevania film was reported as officially canceled.

Notes

References

External links

 
 Akumajō Dracula series at Konami Tokyo 
 
 

 
Konami franchises
Dark fantasy video games
Video game franchises
Video games about demons
Video games about vampires
Video games set in Europe
Video game franchises introduced in 1986
Horror video games
Metroidvania games
Video games related to anime and manga
Video games adapted into comics
Video games adapted into television shows
action-adventure games by series